Lake Dallas Independent School District is a public school district based in Lake Dallas, Texas (USA).

In addition to Lake Dallas, the district serves almost all of the town of Hickory Creek as well as portions of Corinth and Shady Shores.

In 2009, it was rated "academically acceptable" by the Texas Education Agency.

Schools
Lake Dallas High School (Grades 9-12)
Lake Dallas Middle School (Grades 6-8)
Lake Dallas Elementary School (Grades PK-5)
Corinth Elementary School (Grades PK-5)
Shady Shores Elementary School (Grades PK-5)

References

External links
Lake Dallas ISD

School districts in Denton County, Texas